Affine may describe any of various topics concerned with connections or affinities. 
It may refer to:

 Affine, a relative by marriage in law and anthropology
 Affine cipher, a special case of the more general substitution cipher
 Affine combination, a certain kind of constrained linear combination
 Affine connection, a connection on the tangent bundle of a differentiable manifold
 Affine Coordinate System, a coordinate system that can be viewed as a Cartesian coordinate system where the axes have been placed so that they are not necessarily orthogonal to each other.  See tensor.
 Affine differential geometry, a geometry that studies differential invariants under the action of the special affine group
 Affine gap penalty, the most widely used scoring function used for sequence alignment, especially in bioinformatics 
 Affine geometry, a geometry characterized by parallel lines
 Affine group, the group of all invertible affine transformations from any affine space over a field K into itself
 Affine logic, a substructural logic whose proof theory rejects the structural rule of contraction
 Affine representation, a continuous group homomorphism whose values are automorphisms of an affine space
 Affine scheme, the spectrum of prime ideals of a commutative ring
 Affine morphism, a morphism of schemes such that the pre-image of an open affine subscheme is affine

 Affine space, an abstract structure that generalises the affine-geometric properties of Euclidean space
 Affine tensor, a tensor belonging to an affine coordinate system
 Affine transformation, a transformation that preserves the relation of parallelism between lines

See also  
Affinity (disambiguation)

Mathematics disambiguation pages